Center Township may refer to:

Arkansas
 Center Township, Montgomery County, Arkansas, in Montgomery County, Arkansas
 Center Township, Polk County, Arkansas, in Polk County, Arkansas
 Center Township, Pope County, Arkansas
 Center Township, Prairie County, Arkansas, in Prairie County, Arkansas
 Center Township, Sebastian County, Arkansas, in Sebastian County, Arkansas
 Center Township, Washington County, Arkansas

Indiana
 Center Township, Benton County, Indiana
 Center Township, Boone County, Indiana
 Center Township, Clinton County, Indiana
 Center Township, Dearborn County, Indiana
 Center Township, Delaware County, Indiana
 Center Township, Gibson County, Indiana
 Center Township, Grant County, Indiana
 Center Township, Greene County, Indiana
 Center Township, Hancock County, Indiana
 Center Township, Hendricks County, Indiana
 Center Township, Howard County, Indiana
 Center Township, Jennings County, Indiana
 Center Township, Lake County, Indiana
 Center Township, LaPorte County, Indiana
 Center Township, Marion County, Indiana
 Center Township, Marshall County, Indiana
 Center Township, Martin County, Indiana
 Center Township, Porter County, Indiana
 Center Township, Posey County, Indiana
 Center Township, Ripley County, Indiana
 Center Township, Rush County, Indiana
 Center Township, Starke County, Indiana
 Center Township, Union County, Indiana
 Center Township, Vanderburgh County, Indiana
 Center Township, Wayne County, Indiana

Iowa
 Center Township, Allamakee County, Iowa
 Center Township, Calhoun County, Iowa
 Center Township, Cedar County, Iowa
 Center Township, Clinton County, Iowa
 Center Township, Decatur County, Iowa
 Center Township, Dubuque County, Iowa
 Center Township, Emmet County, Iowa
 Center Township, Fayette County, Iowa
 Center Township, Henry County, Iowa
 Center Township, Jefferson County, Iowa
 Center Township, Mills County, Iowa
 Center Township, Monona County, Iowa
 Center Township, O'Brien County, Iowa
 Center Township, Pocahontas County, Iowa
 Center Township, Pottawattamie County, Iowa
 Center Township, Shelby County, Iowa 
 Center Township, Sioux County, Iowa
 Center Township, Wapello County, Iowa
 Center Township, Winnebago County, Iowa

Kansas
 Center Township, Atchison County, Kansas
 Center Township, Chautauqua County, Kansas
 Center Township, Clark County, Kansas
 Center Township, Cloud County, Kansas
 Center Township, Decatur County, Kansas
 Center Township, Dickinson County, Kansas
 Center Township, Doniphan County, Kansas
 Center Township, Hodgeman County, Kansas
 Center Township, Jewell County, Kansas
 Center Township, Lyon County, Kansas, in Lyon County, Kansas
 Center Township, Marshall County, Kansas, in Marshall County, Kansas
 Center Township, Mitchell County, Kansas, in Mitchell County, Kansas
 Center Township, Nemaha County, Kansas, in Nemaha County, Kansas
 Center Township, Ness County, Kansas, in Ness County, Kansas
 Center Township, Ottawa County, Kansas, in Ottawa County, Kansas
 Center Township, Pottawatomie County, Kansas, in Pottawatomie County, Kansas
 Center Township, Rawlins County, Kansas, in Rawlins County, Kansas
 Center Township, Reno County, Kansas, in Reno County, Kansas
 Center Township, Rice County, Kansas, in Rice County, Kansas
 Center Township, Riley County, Kansas, in Riley County, Kansas
 Center Township, Rush County, Kansas, in Rush County, Kansas
 Center Township, Russell County, Kansas
 Center Township, Smith County, Kansas, in Smith County, Kansas
 Center Township, Stevens County, Kansas, in Stevens County, Kansas
 Center Township, Wilson County, Kansas
 Center Township, Woodson County, Kansas, in Woodson County, Kansas

Michigan
 Center Township, Emmet County, Michigan

Minnesota
 Center Township, Minnesota

Missouri
 Center Township, Buchanan County, Missouri
 Center Township, Dade County, Missouri
 Center Township, Hickory County, Missouri
 Center Township, Knox County, Missouri
 Center Township, McDonald County, Missouri
 Center Township, Ralls County, Missouri
 Center Township, St. Clair County, Missouri
 Center Township, Vernon County, Missouri

Nebraska
 Center Township, Buffalo County, Nebraska
 Center Township, Butler County, Nebraska
 Center Township, Hall County, Nebraska, in Hall County, Nebraska
 Center Township, Phelps County, Nebraska
 Center Township, Saunders County, Nebraska

North Carolina
 Center Township, Chatham County, North Carolina, in Chatham County, North Carolina
 Center Township, Stanly County, North Carolina, in Stanly County, North Carolina

North Dakota
 Center Township, Richland County, North Dakota, in Richland County, North Dakota

Ohio
 Center Township, Carroll County, Ohio
 Center Township, Columbiana County, Ohio
 Center Township, Guernsey County, Ohio
 Center Township, Mercer County, Ohio
 Center Township, Monroe County, Ohio
 Center Township, Morgan County, Ohio
 Center Township, Noble County, Ohio
 Center Township, Williams County, Ohio
 Center Township, Wood County, Ohio

Pennsylvania
 Center Township, Beaver County, Pennsylvania
 Center Township, Butler County, Pennsylvania
 Center Township, Greene County, Pennsylvania
 Center Township, Indiana County, Pennsylvania
 Center Township, Snyder County, Pennsylvania

South Dakota
 Center Township, Aurora County, South Dakota, in Aurora County, South Dakota

See also
Centre Township (disambiguation)

Township name disambiguation pages